Eristena orthoteles is a moth in the family Crambidae. It was described by Edward Meyrick in 1894. It is found on Sumbawa in Indonesia.

References

Acentropinae
Moths described in 1894